Ferdinand Feldhofer (born 23 October 1979) is an Austrian football coach and a former player.

Career

Club 
Feldhofer started his career as a youth player with TuS Vorau and TSV Pöllau in Styria before joining Sturm Graz with whom he won the double in 1999. He moved on a free to Rapid Wien in 2002, after refusing to extend his deal with Sturm and making the way to court because he was subsequently put back in Sturm's amateur side, Feldhofer ended up winning the case. He clinched another league title with Rapid in 2005 and then left to become skipper of Wacker Innsbruck. In summer 2008 he decided to return to Sturm, where he signed a 3-year contract.

National team 
He made his debut for Austria in a March 2002 friendly match against Slovakia and went on to earn 13 caps scoring one goal in a friendly against Trinidad and Tobago in Vienna. His last international was a March 2007 friendly match against Ghana. He was not considered for Austria's Euro 2008 squad.

Managerial career 
After acquiring his UEFA A Licence in June 2012, Feldhofer was a group manager at the "LAZ Weiz" in Weiz from 2013-2014. After that, from 2014 to 2015, he was working as an individual trainer for the ÖFB at the LAZ Styria. On the 10th of October, Feldhofer was revealed as manager of Austrian Regionalliga club SV Lafnitz and two days later started his work there. He was able to win the Austrian Regionalliga Central with the club, getting promoted to the Austrian 2. Liga by doing so. In October of 2019, Feldhofer acquired his UEFA Pro Licence, the highest of Coach licences which is required in order to coach professional teams.

In December of 2019, Feldhofer became coach of Austrian Bundesliga club Wolfsberger AC. Under him, the club was able to record what probably were the biggest achievements in the history of the club to date. At the end of the 2019/20 season, the Wolfsberger club stood at third place, which was the best season result in the history of the club, with this they were also able to immediately qualify for the Europa League for the second time. In 2020/21, the club was able to pass the group stage of said competition for the first time in club history but their run was put to a halt after two ties against Tottenham Hotspur. In the league however, the club was struggling to find continuous wins as they were, among other problems, missing a goalscorer of high caliber with Shon Weissman having departed to Real Valladolid. These smaller problems were however put in the background after it became public that Feldhofer had seemingly repeatedly been having fights with club skipper Michael Liendl putting him on the bench a few times before finally leaving him, together with two other leading players Michael Novak and Christopher Wernitznig, out of the match-day squad before their cup-clash against LASK, the game ended in a 0-1 loss after added time and Feldhofer decided to step down from his role as club-coach the following day, leaving the club at fifth in the table. 

Since 28 November 2021, Feldhofer managed Austrian club SK Rapid Wien. Feldhofer was fired by Rapid on 16 October 2022.

Managerial statistics

Honours

As player 
Austrian Football Bundesliga: 1997-98, 1998–99, 2010-11 (Sturm Graz) and 2004–05 (Rapid Vienna)
 Austrian Cup: 1998–99, 2009–10 (Sturm Graz)

As coach 
 Austrian Regionalliga Central: 2017-18 (SV Lafnitz)

References 

 http://www.laola1.at/de/fussball/bundesliga/news/feldhofer-beendet-seine-karriere/page/58650-32-48---7.html 
 https://web.archive.org/web/20161012100515/http://www.collegeweiz-stfv.at/trainer/ferdinand-feldhofer/
 http://sportnet.at/home/fussball/international/4840537/Fussball-Live_ExSturmKicker-Ferdinand-Feldhofer-hat-neuen-Job
 https://www.laola1.at/de/red/fussball/2--liga/news/2--liga--lafnitz-trainer-feldhofer-erhaelt-uefa-pro-lizenz/
 https://www.rzpelletswac.at/2019/12/23/feldhofer-neuer-cheftrainer/
 https://www.laola1.at/de/red/fussball/oefb-cup/news/wac-boss-riegler-zur-causa-feldhofer-liendl---eine-ungute-sache-/
 https://www.rzpelletswac.at/2021/03/04/feldhofer-tritt-zurueck/
https://www.laola1.at/de/red/fussball/bundesliga/news/feldhofer-neuer-rapid-coach/

External links
 
 Player stats at Rapid Archiv 

1979 births
Living people
People from Hartberg District
Association football defenders
Austrian footballers
Austria international footballers
SK Sturm Graz players
SK Rapid Wien players
FC Wacker Innsbruck (2002) players
Austrian Football Bundesliga players
Footballers from Styria
Austrian football managers
Wolfsberger AC managers
SK Rapid Wien managers
Austrian Football Bundesliga managers